The common extensor tendon is a tendon that attaches to the lateral epicondyle of the humerus.

Structure 
The common extensor tendon serves as the upper attachment (in part) for the superficial muscles that are located on the posterior aspect of the forearm:
 Extensor carpi radialis brevis
 Extensor digitorum
 Extensor digiti minimi
 Extensor carpi ulnaris
The tendon of extensor carpi radialis brevis is usually the most major tendon to which the other tendons merge.

Function 
The common extensor tendon is the major attachment point for extensor muscles of the forearm. This enables finger extension and aids in forearm supination.

Clinical significance 
Lateral elbow pain can be caused by various pathologies of the common extensor tendon. Overuse injuries can lead to inflammation. Tennis elbow is a common issue with the common extensor tendon.

See also
 Common flexor tendon
 Tennis elbow (lateral epicondylitis)

References

Tendons
Upper limb anatomy